Thomas Ball may refer to:

 Thomas Ball (priest) (1590–1659), English divine
 Thomas Ball (Archdeacon of Chichester) (1697–1770), Church of England clergyman
 Thomas Ball (New Zealand politician) (1809–1897), represented the Mongonui electorate
 Thomas Ball (artist) (1819–1911), American sculptor
 Thomas Henry Ball (1859–1944), American politician and U.S. Representative from Texas
 Thomas Ball (New Zealand cricketer) (1865–1953), New Zealand cricketer
 Thomas R. Ball (1896–1943), American politician and U.S. Representative from Connecticut
 Tommy Ball (1900–1923), English footballer
 Thomas Ball (Provost of Cumbrae) (died 1916), Scottish priest
 Thomas Ball (South African cricketer) (born 1951), South African cricketer
 Thomas Ball (computer scientist) (born 1965), see SLAM project
 Thomas Ball (activist) (died 2011), American father's rights advocate and self-immolator